Aerolíneas Argentinas, formally Aerolíneas Argentinas S.A., is Argentina's largest airline and the country flag carrier. A consortium led by Iberia took control of the airline in 1990, and Grupo Marsans acquired the company and its subsidiaries in 2001, following a period of severe financial difficulties that put the airline on the brink of closure. The company has been run by the Argentine government since late 2008, when the country regained control of the airline after it was taken over from the Spanish owners. , Aerolíneas Argentinas was state-owned. It has its headquarters in Buenos Aires.

Aerolíneas Argentinas and its former sister company Austral Líneas Aéreas operates from two hubs, both located in Buenos Aires: Aeroparque Jorge Newbery and Ministro Pistarini International Airport. Its narrow body fleet, used on domestic and regional routes, consists of Embraer 190, Boeing 737-700, 737-800 and 737 MAX 8, whereas intercontinental and transoceanic services are flown on the wide body Airbus A330-200.

History

Early years to privatisation 

The history of the airline began in 1929, when Compagnie Générale Aéropostale (Aéropostale) started airmail operations between Buenos Aires and Asunción using Laté-25 equipment, later expanding its network to cities located in the Patagonia. Many French pilots (including aviator and author Antoine de Saint-Exupéry) flew for the company in its beginnings. Argentine personnel replaced the Frenchmen as they gradually withdrew from the airline, and shortly after Aéropostale's Argentine subsidiary Aeroposta Argentina was formed. In 1947, this airline became a mixed-stock company in which the government had a 20% stake and private investors held the balance. As Aeroposta expanded its network southwards and incorporated the Douglas DC-3 into its fleet, another three mixed-stock companies were in operation at the time: Aviación del Litoral Fluvial Argentino (ALFA) mainly operated flying boats northwards to the Mesopotamia, Flota Aérea Mercante Argentina (FAMA) operated overseas services with DC-4s as its mainstay equipment, and Zonas Oeste y Norte de Aerolíneas Argentinas (ZONDA) was mainly concerned with operations in the northwest region. The state holding was officially rebranded as Aerolíneas Argentinas-Empresa del Estado.

In , almost 10 months prior to the start of operations, five new Convairs were already acquired. As early as 1950, the Douglas DC-6 was added to the fleet, and was used to launch a weekly Buenos Aires–Rio de Janeiro–Natal–Dakar–Lisbon–Paris–Frankfurt flight in late 1950. Soon afterwards, Douglas DC-4s joined the fleet and services were inaugurated to Santiago de Chile, Lima, Santa Cruz, and São Paulo. The company carried 291,988 passengers in 1954, and 327,808 in 1955. On , it was reported that Aerolíneas Argentinas had ordered ten F-27 Friendships. The Comet had begun commercial jet services in the 1950s, and the carrier once again set the pace among the South American airlines, when Aerolíneas' president A. Cdre. Juan José Güiraldes persuaded Argentina's President Arturo Frondizi to buy six of them, becoming the first overseas airline in ordering the type. On 7 March, she was christened Las Tres Marías by Frondizi's wife Elena Faggionato at Ezeiza Airport. Comet flights to New York City began in May 1959.

In the early 1960s, the fleet consisted of four Comet 4s, four Convair 240s, 15 DC-3s, six DC-4s, five DC-6s and six Sandringhams, whereas the ten F-27s ordered in 1957 were still pending delivery. The 1960s saw the carrier ordering the Avro 748 turboprop airliner. The aircraft started services on 15 February 1962 between Buenos Aires and Punta del Este. The first flight for the Caravelle in Aerolíneas colours was Buenos Aires–Santiago de Chile on 1 April 1962. At  the carrier had 5,960 employees, and the fleet consisted of three Comet 4s, one Comet 4C, three Caravelles, 12 DC-3s (three of them freighters), six DC-4s, three DC-6s and 12 HS-748s. In 1966, loans granted by the Ex-Im Bank and Boeing permitted the purchase of a number of Boeing 707-320Bs in a deal worth . In , the carrier entered a pool agreement with Lufthansa covering services between Germany and Argentina.

By , Aerolíneas Argentinas had a fleet of six Boeing 707s that served routes to Europe and the United States, three Caravelles 6Rs and four Comet 4s that flew regional services, and 12 HS-748s that flew domestically, whereas six Boeing 737-200s were on order. The incorporation of the Fokker F-28 into the fleet in the mid-1970s, prompted the withdrawal of the last HS-748s, making the company to be the first South American airline in operating an all-jet aircraft park. Frankfurt, Madrid, and Rome became the first destinations to be served with the new 747s, starting .

The airline was assigned by law the monopoly of international operations from Argentina in 1971. This meant no other Argentine airline was able to operate international flights, let alone the already created Austral. The carrier therefore became the flag carrier of the country. The same law also assigned Aerolíneas Argentinas a 50% share of the domestic market.

Following the acquisition of Austral by the Argentine government in 1980, both Aerolíneas Argentinas and Austral became government-owned, to the extent that some routes were simultaneously operated, even using similar equipment. However, a state of continuous tension existed over salary differences between both companies that eventually led the Aerolíneas Argentinas' pilots to a three-week-long strike that started on 1 July 1986. During this strike, the government leased pilots from the Argentine Air Force to operate some aircraft. Other companies took advantage of this situation and gained the market share that Aerolíneas Argentinas lost, as domestic routes were operated by Austral, LADE, and LAPA, and the government temporarily authorised foreign carriers to exploit the company's international routes.

Using a Boeing 747-200, the airline operated the first transantarctic commercial flight on 7 June 1980. During and shortly after the Falklands War in 1982, the airline was banned from British airspace. A flight from London-Gatwick to Argentina's capital was once scheduled, but because of the ban, passengers bound to Argentina had to change planes at Madrid-Barajas.

At , Aerolíneas Argentinas had 9,822 employees. At this time, the fleet comprised one Boeing 707-320B, one Boeing 707-320C, seven Boeing 727-200s, 10 Boeing 737-200s, two Boeing 737-200Cs, five Boeing 747-200Bs, one Boeing 747SP, two Fokker F28-1000s, and a Fokker F28-4000. The international network radiated from Buenos Aires and served Asuncion, Auckland, Bogotá, Cape Town, Caracas, Frankfurt, Guayaquil, Hong Kong, La Paz, Lima, Los Angeles, Madrid, Mexico City, Miami, Montevideo, Montreal, New York, Paris, Rio de Janeiro, Rome, Sao Paulo, Santiago, Porto Alegre, and Zurich.

Privatisation: 1990–2008 

The privatisation of the airline started being considered under the government of Raúl Alfonsín, when SAS was proposed to become a 40% shareholder of the state company. This was firmly resisted by the Peronist opposition. Another consortium led by Alitalia, American Airlines, KLM and Varig had earlier pulled out from the process. Paradoxically, one of the first actions taken by the new Peronist government was to privatise the carrier, after airily opposing to the privatisation propositions of its predecessor. The sale of the airline followed the divestiture of the government shareholding in the national telephone company, which also took place in 1990 during the Carlos Menem presidency's privatisation wave, intended to divest the participation of the state in a number of enterprises to reduce the US$40 billion debt to foreign banks by  billion. Aimed at favouring the privatisation process, the government absorbed a  million debt the company took between 1981 and 1982 for capitalisation purposes. Despite the carrier being regarded as overstaffed and bureaucratic, it was debt-free at that time, having an average profitability of  million a year; it actually had  million in revenues for the year prior to the privatisation. The privatisation contract, which specified the buyer should pay  million in cash and  million in external debt bonds, was ratified by the Supreme Court. Furthermore, a clause enabled the buyer to indebt Aerolíneas Argentinas for the buyout process; this was reflected in the airline's 1991 balance, which included debts worth  million for its own acquisition. This privatisation process was not ruled as illegal until 2009.

Aerolíneas Argentinas and Austral never merged throughout the private era, and remained as separate companies with the same shareholder. Iberia subsequently boosted its stake in the airline to 85% in  after a  cash injection. Out of the remaining 15%, the Argentine government held the 5% stake it was initially assigned, while 10% belonged to the employees. Furthermore, at this stage the Argentine government resigned to the voting privilege it had in the directory of the airline. Iberia was subsequently obliged by the European Commission to cut its stake in Aerolíneas Argentinas as a condition for receiving state aid. It thence reduced its participation to 20%, transferring the remaining 65% to Interinvest/Andes holding, a consortium comprising the Spanish government holding company (SEPI) – the actual owner of Iberia before it was privatised in 2001 – and banks Merrill Lynch and Bankers Trust, among others. In , Iberia cut again its stake in Aerolíneas Argentinas from 20% to 10%, while American Airlines's parent company AMR acquired a 10% stake of Aerolineas Argentinas/Austral's major stockholder Interinvest, equivalent to a participation of 8.5% in both Argentine companies, with the commitment of finding investors for Aerolíneas Argentinas. AMR's 8.5% operation was finally cleared by the United States Department of Justice in early July 1998. By that time, the Argentine government still owned a 5% stake in Aerolíneas Argentinas. Losses had mounted to  million since 1992, totalling  million only for 1999. The restructuring plan presented by AMR, mainly aimed at reverting these losses, was rejected by the SEPI. Furthermore, given that the AMR Corporation did not find purchasers for the company, the SEPI put the control of the airline back into Spanish hands. The vacancy left in the management positions that followed the departure of the AMR holding from Aerolíneas was soon filled in by the SEPI.

At this time, the aircraft park consisted of two Airbus A310-300s, four Airbus A340-200s, four Boeing 737-200s, Boeing 737-200 Advanced, one Boeing 737-200C, and nine Boeing 747-200Bs, whereas six Airbus A340-600s were on order. The list of international destinations served at the time was Asunción, Auckland, Bogotá, Cancún, Caracas, Florianópolis, Lima, Madrid, Mexico City, Miami, Montevideo, New York, Orlando, Paris, Punta del Este, Rio de Janeiro, Rome, Santiago, São Paulo, and Sydney; domestic services to Catamarca, Comodoro Rivadavia, Cordoba, Corrientes, Esquel, Iguazu, Jujuy, La Rioja, Mar del Plata, Mendoza, Neuquen, Posadas, President Roque Saenz Pena, Resistencia, Rio Gallegos, Rio Grande, Rosario, Salta, San Carlos de Bariloche, Santa Cruz, Santa Fe, Santiago del Estero, Trelew, Tucuman, Ushuaia, and Villa Gesell were also operated.

Allegations of corruption were made on the basis of the price paid by Iberia and the Spanish firm's ulterior conduct (including some convoluted lease-back operations), with the airline paying the price for its own purchase with its assets. Subsequent management by American Airlines and SEPI drove Aerolíneas Argentinas into an almost terminal crisis in 2001. In , the aftermath began after the airline filed for bankruptcy protection from creditors, and went into administration; the salaries were paid by the Argentine government, instead of using money coming from the SEPI. The payment of salaries for the upcoming months was suspended, as the mechanics union refused to accept the reorganisation plan raised by the SEPI to keep the company afloat. On 6 June, flights to Auckland, Los Angeles, Miami, New York, São Paulo, Sydney and Rio de Janeiro were halted. Owing to a  million debt with the fuel supplier, the suspension of the daily flight to Madrid, which also served Rome and was the last connection with Europe, followed a week later. After this, most of the fleet was grounded, and only 30% and 10% of domestic and international flights, respectively, were operating.

Marsans group acquired a 92% stake through its subsidiary Air Comet from the SEPI in late 2001, and committed to inject  million capital with the intention of resuming short– as well as long–haul services. The resumption of international flights started in early . At , the airline and its subsidiaries employed 7,090. That year, the first profit in five years was announced, along with an important increase in market share.

Renationalisation: 2008–onwards 

In , an initial agreement between the Argentine government and Grupo Marsans in which the latter would decrease its participation in the airline to 35% was announced; in reducing their holding, Marsans would make room for new private investors, as well as for the government of Argentina to increase its stake in the airline from 5 to 20%.

At this time, the company had 40% of its fleet grounded. The act renationalising Aerolíneas Argentinas and its subsidiary Austral Líneas Aéreas was passed by the Chamber of Deputies in August 2008, and became law in  following the 46–21 vote in the Argentine Senate. There were disagreements regarding the value to be paid by Grupo Marsans to the government. Negotiations fell through, and an administrator was appointed by an Argentine court in  that year to oversee the running of the company.

In September 2011, the airline emerged from the reorganisation proceedings it had filed in 2001. In late , the government announced an austerity plan for the company to reduce the deficit it has been incurring since being taken over from Marsans; the plan included the revision of unprofitable routes, the reduction of pilot/aircraft pay rates, and the abandonment of obsolete equipment, among others.

Passenger traffic for the group reached a record 8.5 million in 2013, a 57% increase from the time of its renationalization in 2008. Revenues rose to a record of US$2 billion in 2013, an 85% increase from 2008 levels; losses likewise declined from $860 million (78% of revenues) to $250 million (12% of revenues). Corporate assets as of 2012 had tripled to over $1.6 billion, as the group's fleet grew from 26 to 63 planes and the average age of same was reduced from 20 years to 7.5. In 2017, projections for 2018 were given at 14.5 million passengers and a loss of $90 million.

Corporate affairs

Ownership and subsidiaries

Aerolíneas Argentinas was completely owned by the government of Argentina, . , Aerolíneas Argentinas Cargo, domestic airline Austral Líneas Aéreas, ramp service provider Aerohandling, cargo division JetPaq S.A., and tourism operator Optar S.A. are listed as Aerolíneas Argentinas subsidiaries. The airline and its subsidiaries operate from two hubs, both located in Buenos Aires. Operations of domestic and regional flights by the smaller aircraft types in the fleet are concentrated at Aeroparque Jorge Newbery, which also serves as its operating base, whereas Ministro Pistarini International Airport is mainly used for international services, although some regional and a few domestic services are operated, as well. The company provides free-of-charge transportation to those passengers who need to change from one airport to the other. , the airline and its subsidiaries employ 11,515.

In May 2020, as a result of the COVID-19 pandemic, it was announced that Aerolíneas Argentinas and its Austral subsidiary would be merged into one enterprise. On 1 December 2020, it was announced that the merger had been completed, with Austral's fleet integrated into Aerolíneas' fleet, agreements having been reached with both airlines' pilot and cabin crew unions, and with the Aerolíneas Argentinas brand retained.

Key people
, Pablo Ceriani holds the president position.

Headquarters
Aerolíneas Argentinas is headquartered at Aeroparque Jorge Newbery, located in Buenos Aires city.

Destinations

Alliances
With the mentoring of Delta Air Lines, the company signed an agreement to begin the process of joining SkyTeam in late .

Codeshare agreements
, Aerolíneas Argentinas has codeshare agreements with these airlines:

 Aeroméxico
 Air Europa
 Air France
 Delta Air Lines
 El Al
 Gol Transportes Aéreos
 ITA Airways
 KLM
 Korean Air

Fleet

Current

Aerolíneas Argentinas, following its merger with subsidiary Austral, operates the following aircraft .

Retired

Aerolíneas Argentinas previously operated the following aircraft:

Airbus A310-300
Airbus A320-200
Airbus A340-200
Airbus A340-300
Avro York
Boeing 707-320B
Boeing 707-320C
Boeing 727-100
Boeing 727-200
Boeing 737-200
Boeing 737-200 Advanced
Boeing 737-200C
Boeing 737-300F
Boeing 737-500
Boeing 747SP
Boeing 747-200B
Boeing 747-400

Caravelle III
Caravelle VI-N
Caravelle VI-R
Convair CV-240
Comet 4
Comet 4C
Douglas C-47
Douglas C-47A
Douglas C-47B
Douglas C-54A
Douglas DC-3
Douglas DC-4
Douglas DC-6
Fokker F28 Mk-1000
Fokker F28 Mk-4000
Hawker Siddeley 748
Lockheed Constellation
McDonnell Douglas MD-83
McDonnell Douglas MD-88
Short Sandringham
YS-11-100
Vickers Viking

Recent developments

Aerolíneas Argentinas began to modernise its fleet in 2009, when it agreed to lease 10 Boeing 737-700s and to purchase two more of these aircraft that would act as a replacement for the ageing Boeing 737-200s and MD-80s. Along with the first leased ones, the two brand new aircraft, which became the first ones acquired by the company in 17 years, were incorporated into the fleet in mid-2009. In October 2009, the carrier had announced it was looking for about six Boeing 737-800 aircraft, both to complement the 12 Boeing 737-700s and to replace the ageing Boeing 737-500s. In November, the Boeing 737-200 made its last flight on a scheduled Buenos Aires–Catamarca–La Rioja–Buenos Aires passenger service. In late November 2010, the airline agreed to lease a further ten aircraft of the –700 series from ILFC, which started being delivered in April 2011. , the airline was considering both the Airbus A350-900 and the Boeing 787-9 as replacement aircraft for the long-haul fleet. The incorporation of leased Airbus A330-200s in 2013 for serving routes to Bogotá, Cancún, Caracas and Miami was also planned, whereas an increased maximum takeoff weight version of the same type was also under consideration to partly replace the Airbus A340-200s by 2016.

In  the same year, an agreement for the acquisition of 20 more aircraft of the type, worth  billion, was announced. In addition to the lease of four used Airbus A330-200s from ILFC —the first of them delivered in — Aerolíneas Argentinas signed in  a memorandum of understanding with Airbus, aimed at acquiring four more aircraft of the type. These aircraft will be fitted with GE Aviation CF6-80E1 engines.

With its ageing long-haul fleet in need of replacement, Aerolineas CEO Mario Dell’Acqua stated in November 2017 that the company was evaluating a replacement for the Airbus A340, with a decision to be made in 2018. The company was considering either the Boeing 787 or the Airbus A350 as possible replacements, with the intention of the new fleet entering service in 2020. The Airbus A330 will also be replaced as part of the long-haul fleet replacement, though they are to be retired progressively after the A340s. In November 2017, Aerolíneas Argentinas became the first Latin American airline in taking delivery of a Boeing 737 MAX 8; the aircraft flew its first revenue service on the Buenos Aires-Ezeiza–Mendoza route.

Livery
In , Aerolíneas Argentinas revamped its image to give the airline a more modern appearance. The new logo is a combination of light blue and grey colours. Likewise, the previous eurowhite livery is replaced with a combination of the Argentine flag colours plus grey. Subsidiary airline Austral also adopted this new livery, additionally including a red cheatline.

Accidents and incidents

According to the Aviation Safety Network database, the last accident involving a company's aircraft that yielded fatalities was in 1970.  Aviation Safety Network records 43 accidents or incidents for Aerolíneas Argentinas since it started operations in 1950. The company ranks among the safest airlines in the world.

See also 
Transport in Argentina

Notes

References

External links 

 
 SkyTeam

 
Airlines established in 1949
Airlines of Argentina
Argentine brands
Argentine companies established in 1949
Former seaplane operators
Government-owned airlines
Latin American and Caribbean Air Transport Association
SkyTeam